The Night the World Exploded is a 1957 science fiction, disaster film. The film was written by Jack Natteford and Luci Ward, and directed by Fred F. Sears for producer Sam Katzman. Both Katzman and Sears were great exponents of the low-budget B film genre. The film was theatrically released on a double bill with The Giant Claw.

Plot
The scientific team of Dr. David Conway (William Leslie), Dr. Ellis Morton (Tristram Coffin) and Laura Hutchinson (Kathryn Grant) has built a machine that can predict earthquakes. After predicting one will hit California within the next 24 hours to a uniformly skeptical Gov. Cheney (Raymond Greenleaf) and state-level political and civil defense officials, the earthquake does materialize and does immense damage to northern parts of the state. Now with the support and funding necessary from the reformed skeptics, the team works on further predictions and comes to the conclusion that a wave of earthquakes are pending in and around the southwestern United States. They trace the epicenter of the pending disaster to an area beneath the Carlsbad Caverns and descend to a hitherto unexplored level.

Here they find a strange ore which, when removed from contact with water, becomes highly explosive, and realize that this element, somehow working its way from deep in the Earth, is responsible for the earthquakes. Although the material is not analyzed for specific atomic traits, it is named Element 112 just because so far, 111 chemical elements had been discovered. A computer determines that in approximately one month, enough of Element 112 will emerge from the deep earth to cause the entire planet to explode. A desperate operation ensues worldwide to blast and trench the ground to let water in and cover Element 112, keeping it from drying out and expanding.

Cast

 Kathryn Grant as Laura Hutchinson
 William Leslie as Dr. David Conway
 Tristram Coffin as Dr. Ellis Morton (as Tris Coffin)
 Raymond Greenleaf as Gov. Chaney
 Charles Evans as General Bortes
 Frank J. Scannell as Sheriff Quinn (as Frank Scannell)
 Marshall Reed as the General's Aide
 Fred Coby as Ranger Brown
 Paul Savage as Ranger Gold
 Terry Frost as Chief Rescue Worker
 Lyle Latell as Civil Defense Chief Carson

Production
The Night the World Exploded went into production with shooting locations at the Carlsbad Caverns in New Mexico; the Iverson Movie Ranch in Chatsworth, California; and the ElectroData (Burroughs) Corporation Building in Pasadena, California. Principal photography took place from November 8–20, 1956.

Reception
Columbia Pictures released The Night the World Exploded theatrically as a double bill with The Giant Claw (1957). Critical reception was not positive, with Hal Erickson of The New York Times later commenting, "Despite all the scientific doublespeak, 'The Night the World Exploded' is doggedly non-intellectual in its execution and appeal."

Film critic Leonard Maltin noted that the film disappointed: "Scientists discover a strange, exploding mineral that threatens to bring about title catastrophe and rush to prevent it. OK idea hampered by low budget."

See also
 List of American films of 1957

References

Bibliography

 Walker, John, ed. Halliwell's Who's Who in the Movies (14th ed.). New York: HarperResource, 1997. .

External links
 
 
 
 
Review of film at Variety

1957 films
1950s science fiction films
American science fiction films
American black-and-white films
Columbia Pictures films
Films directed by Fred F. Sears
Films shot in Los Angeles County, California
Films shot in New Mexico
1950s English-language films
1950s American films